Tetsuya Iwanaga may refer to:

 Tetsuya Iwanaga (model) (born 1986), Japanese fashion model
 Tetsuya Iwanaga (voice actor) (born 1970), Japanese voice actor